The siege of Exeter may refer to:
 The Mercian Siege of Exeter (c. 630), also known as the Siege of Caer-Uisc. Almost certainly fictional.
 The Danish Siege of Exeter (893)
 The Siege of Exeter (1068), during the Norman Conquest of England
 The Siege of Exeter (1549) which took place during the Prayer Book Rebellion
 One of the sieges of Exeter that took place during the First English Civil War:
in 1643, by the Royalists
in 1645–6, by the Parliamentarians

History of Exeter